Elections to Liverpool City Council were held on 1 November 1935. One third of the council seats were up for election, the term of office of each councillor being three years.

Seven of the thirty nine seats up for election were uncontested.

After the election, the composition of the council was:

Election result

Ward results

* - Councillor seeking re-election

Comparisons are made with the 1932 election results.

Abercromby

Aigburth

Allerton

Anfield

Breckfield

Brunswick

Castle Street

Childwall

Croxteth

Dingle

Edge Hill

Everton

Exchange

Fairfield

Fazakerley

Garston

Granby

Great George

Kensington

Kirkdale

Low Hill

Much Woolton

Netherfield

North Scotland

Old Swan

Prince's Park

Sandhills

St. Anne's

St. Domingo

St. Peter's

Sefton Park East

Sefton Park West

South Scotland

Vauxhall

Walton

Warbreck

Wavertree

Wavertree West

West Derby

Aldermanic elections

Aldermanic election 9 November 1935

The terms of office of twenty aldermen expired, so there was an election to replace these positions at the council meeting on 9 November 1935.

This was the first Aldermanic election since the Local Government Act, 1933, which disenfranchised aldermen from voting in aldermanic elections. Only councillors were eligible to vote in the aldermanic elections. Although only Councillors had voted in aldermanic elections to Liverpool City Council for some years.

* - re-elected alderman.

Aldermanic Election 3 June 1936

Caused by the death on 5 May 1936 of Alderman Burton William Eills JP (Liberal, last elected as an alderman on 9 November 1932, in whose place Councillor Charles Sydney Jones JP (Liberal, elected unopposed for the Fairfield ward in November 1933) was elected as an alderman by the councillors on 3 June 1936.

The term of office to expire on 9 November 1938.

Aldermanic Election 3 June 1936

Caused by the death of Alderman Frederick Smith (Liberal, elected as an alderman on 9 November 1932), in whose place Councillor Arthur Richard Price (Liberal, elected unopposed for the Anfield ward on 1 November 1933), retired corn merchant of 77 Newsham Drive, Liverpool 6, was elected as an alderman by the councillors on 3 June 1936.

The Term of Office to expire on 9 November 1936.

By-elections

No. 9 Abercromby, 3 December 1935

Caused by the disqualification of Councillor Arthur Lumb (Labour, elected 1 November 1934).

The term of office to expire on 1 November 1937.

No.23 St. Domingo, 12 December 1935

Caused by the election as an alderman on 9 November 1935 of Councillor Rev. Harry Dixon Longbottom (Protestant, last elected 1 November 1933).

The term of office to expire on 1 November 1936.

No. 36 Much Woolton, 19 December 1935

Caused by the resignation of Councillor Ernest Whiteley (Independent, elected 1 November 1934).

The term of office to end on 1 November 1937.

No. 30 Breckfield, 23 January 1936

Caused by the election as an alderman on 9 November 1935 of Councillor Thomas Henry Burton (Conservative, elected 1 November 1933).

The term of office to end on 1 November 1936.

No. 17 Aigburth, 3 March 1936

Caused by the resignation of Councillor Eric Errington MP (Conservative, elected 1 November 1934).

The term of office to end on 1 November 1937.

No. 17 Aigburth, 10 September 1936

Caused by the resignation of Councillor Arthur Donald Dennis (Liberal, elected at the by-election of 3 March 1936).

The term of office to end on 1 November 1937.

No.31 Fairfield, 

Following the death on 5 May 1936 of Alderman Burton William Eills JP (Liberal, last elected as an alderman on 9 November 1932, in whose place Councillor Charles Sydney Jones JP (Liberal, elected unopposed for the Fairfield ward in November 1933) was elected as an alderman by the councillors on 3 June 1936.

No.29 Anfield, 

Following the death of Alderman Frederick Smith (Liberal, elected as an alderman on 9 November 1932), in whose place Councillor Arthur Richard Price (Liberal, elected unopposed for the Anfield ward on 1 November 1933) was elected as an alderman by the councillors on 3 June 1936.

See also

 Liverpool City Council
 Liverpool Town Council elections 1835 - 1879
 Liverpool City Council elections 1880–present
 Mayors and Lord Mayors of Liverpool 1207 to present
 History of local government in England

References

1935
1935 English local elections
1930s in Liverpool